Najah Souss is a Moroccan football club currently playing in the third division. The club is located in the town of Agadir. The team has Stade Al Inbiaâte as its official stadium.

References

Football clubs in Morocco
1974 establishments in Morocco
Association football clubs established in 1974